Echineulima robusta is a species of sea snail, a marine gastropod mollusk in the family Eulimidae.

Distribution
This marine species is mainly distributed around the Hawaiian Islands.

References

External links
 To World Register of Marine Species

Eulimidae
Gastropods described in 1860